Bagh Miran (also Romanized as Bāgh Mīrān and Bāgh-e Mīrān) is a village in Murcheh Khvort Rural District, in the Central District of Shahin Shahr and Meymeh County, Isfahan Province, Iran. At the 2006 census, its population was 24, in 14 families.

References 

Populated places in Shahin Shahr and Meymeh County